Darab County is in Fars province, Iran. The capital of the county is the city of Darab. At the 2006 census, the county's population was 172,938 in 39,955 households. The following census in 2011 counted 189,345 people in 50,595 households. At the 2016 census, the county's population was 201,489 in 59,525 households.

Administrative divisions

The population history and structural changes of Darab County's administrative divisions over three consecutive censuses are shown in the following table. The latest census shows four districts, 12 rural districts, and four cities.

Overview

It has five hundred villages, and possesses a very hot climate, snow being rarely seen there in winter. Darab city have area of about 7,500 square kilometers and a height of 1180 meters. It produces fruits, cereals, cotton, and tobacco, while the lower areas are used for winter crops by the Baharlu tribe. There are also nearby salt mines which have long been utilized. The town Darab, the capital of the district, is situated in a very fertile plain, 140 mi. S.E. of Shiraz. It has a population (in 2000) of about 60,718 and extensive orchards of orange and lemon trees and immense plantations of date-palms. Legend ascribes the foundation of the city to Darius, hence its name Darab-gerd ("Darius-fort").

In the neighborhood there are various remains of antiquity, the most important of which mi. S., is known as the Kalah i Dal-a, or citadel of Darius, and consists of a series of earthworks arranged in a circle round an isolated rock. Nothing, however, remains to fix the date or explain the history of the fortification. Another monument in the vicinity is a gigantic bas-relief, carved on the vertical face of a rock, representing the victory of the Sassanian Shapur I (Sapor) of Persia over the Roman emperor Valerian, A.D. 260.

References

 

Counties of Fars Province